Danielle L. Dixson is an Associate Professor of Marine Ecology in the School of Marine Science and Policy at the University of Delaware. Her research focusses on how human-induced change to marine ecosystems impacts animal behaviour. Her work, now known to be fraudulent, was about understanding how ocean acidification affects the behaviour of coral reef fishes.

Academic career 
Dixson studied Marine Science at the University of Tampa in Florida, obtaining her B.S. in 2005. She went on to obtain her Ph.D. in 2012 under the supervision of Philip Munday, Geoffrey Jones, and Morgan Pratchett at James Cook University, Australia. From 2011, she worked as postdoctoral researcher at Georgia Institute of Technology until her appointment as an Assistant Professor in 2013. In 2015 she began as an assistant professor at the University of Delaware before becoming an associate professor in 2019.

Dixson is the author of Sea Stories, a children's book series based on scientific literature that aims to promote awareness of marine conservation, STEM subjects, and visibiltiy of minorities from an early age. She is a member of the International Society of Chemical Ecology and was the recipient of their Early Career Award in 2019.

Research 
Dixson's research broadly focuses on the relationship of how marine animals sense their environment and how this influences their decisions. Her major research areas include the role of chemical cues in corals and coral reef fishes, and the influence of ocean acidification on fish behaviour.

Misconduct allegations 
Dixson has been accused of fabricating primary data by other researchers in the field and is the subject of ongoing institutional investigations. On August 9, 2022, Science published a piece announcing that an investigation by the University of Delaware found Dixson guilty of scientific misconduct, including data fabrication and falsification related to her work on coral reef fish behaviour. A separate investigation is reportedly being conducted by the Georgia Institute of Technology.

Honours and awards 

 International Society of Chemical Ecology Early Career Award
 National Science Foundation (NSF) Faculty Early Career Development Award
 James Cook University Outstanding Alumni Award

See also
  Oona Lönnstedt See misconduct case of Oona Lönnstedt who was also found to have conducted discredited fish research at James Cook University

Selected publications

References 

Living people
University of Delaware alumni
University of Tampa alumni
Georgia Tech faculty
University of Delaware faculty
American LGBT scientists
Year of birth missing (living people)
21st-century LGBT people
People involved in scientific misconduct incidents
Ecologists
James Cook University alumni
Women ecologists
Women marine biologists